In Albania, the driving licence is the official document which authorizes an individual to drive a motor vehicle: motorbike, car, truck or bus. This driving permit can be obtained only after the successful passing of the theoretical exam on road code knowledge followed by the practical exam which tests an individual's on the road driving skills.
The license is issued by the General Directorate of Road Transport Services (DPSHTRR).

Physical characteristics
The physical characteristics of the driving licence are in 
conformity with the ISO 7810 and ISO 7816-1 standards.
The card is made of a polycarbonate material. It has the following dimensions:

 length: 85,60 mm
 height: 53,98 mm
 thickness: 0,76 mm/± 0,8 mm
 rounded corner: radius 3,18 mm/± 0,30 mm

Security features

 Diffractive Watermark Achr.
 Oblique Angle Feature
 Surface Relief Effect
 Color Effect 
 Dynamic Color Effect
 Guilloche Colorful 
 Image Flip 
 Fine Line Movement Colorful
 Static Matte Effect
 Achromatic Microtext - 250 pm
 Nanotext - 75 pm

Validity and renewal
The validity of driving licences for categories A1, A2, A, B1, B 
and BE is limited to 10 years. The validity of driving licences for 
categories C1, C1E, C, CE, D1, D1E, D, DE is limited to 5 years. 
A medical test is required for renewal after the expiration of the validity term.

License categories

See also 
 Albanian identity card
 Vehicle registration plates of Albania
 Border crossings of Albania

References 

Albania
Road transport in Albania
Identity documents of Albania

sq:Leje Drejtimi